Jiayou may refer to:

Jiayou (1056–1063), era name used by Emperor Renzong of Song
Jiayou, Guangxi, in Lingyun County, Guangxi, China
Jiayou (cheer) (literally "add oil"), expression of encouragement and support in Chinese

See also
Add oil